Helmuth Resch (born 22 May 1933) is an Austrian fencer. He competed in the individual and team sabre events at the 1960 Summer Olympics. Helmuth is still fencing in small European tournaments in the over-55 group. He also goes to fencing classes in Boston part of the year.

References

External links
 

1933 births
Living people
Austrian male sabre fencers
Olympic fencers of Austria
Fencers at the 1960 Summer Olympics
Fencers from Vienna